Fontechiari is a town and comune in the province of Frosinone, Lazio, central Italy. Located in the Comino Valley, the town has borders with the municipalities of Arpino, Broccostella, Casalvieri, Posta Fibreno and Vicalvi.

References

External links
Official website
 Pro Loco 

Cities and towns in Lazio